Pathmasiri Niroshan Bandara Wijekoon (born February 10, 1964) is a Sri Lankan Olympian and the first badminton player to represent Sri Lanka. Wijekoon held the Sri Lankan National Badminton Championships singles title for nine years (1983–1987 and 1989–1992).

Family and early life
Wijekoon is the son of former Minister, MP, Ambassador and Presidential Candidate Ukku Banda Wijekoon. Wijekoon had his education at St. Thomas' College, Bandarawela and Royal College, Colombo.

Career
Wijekoon made his debut in Sri Lankan National Badminton Championships in 1975 as an 11-year-old and went on to win 28 titles; 9 singles, 12 doubles and 7 mixed doubles. He won his first singles title in 1983 as an 18-year-old from Royal College, Colombo

Wijekoon has represented Sri Lanka at three Asian Games and two Commonwealth Games with his greatest achievement being representing Sri Lanka at the 1992 Barcelona Olympics.

1984 he beat Singaporean No 1 at the Thomas Cup and was the first Sri Lankan to win a singles match in a Thomas Cup game. 1992 Wijekoon beat Indias No 1 at the Portugal Open.

Wijekoon competed at the 1992 Summer Olympics in the men's singles. He lost in the first round to Hannes Fuchs, of Austria, 15-9, 15-11. In his home country he won several national championships. He also participated the World Badminton Championships in 1989 in the men's singles losing to Kim Hak-kyun of South Korea 7:15 and 7:15. In his home country, he won nine titles in the men's singles at the Sri Lankan National Badminton Championships between 1983 and 1992.

Retirement and later years
Although the grace of the younger days are fading Wijekoon has no thoughts of hanging the boots. Even now, as Director of the stock brokering firm Asia Securities he still plays in Sri Lankan National Badminton Championships, making his 32nd appearance in 2007.

At the age of 38, unseeded Wijekoon beat the bottom seeded Udaya Wanigasinghe to make a long due singles quarter finals berth. In 2007, at the age of 43, he stretched as far as the semi finals in doubles, beating the second seed on the way.

References

lankanewspapers.com
dailynews.lk
mercantilebadminton.lk
The Sunday Leader 2007.12.23
Daily News 2008.07.14
island.lk

External links
 
 
 

Sri Lankan male badminton players
Olympic badminton players of Sri Lanka
Badminton players at the 1992 Summer Olympics
1964 births
Living people
Badminton players at the 1986 Asian Games
Badminton players at the 1990 Asian Games
Asian Games competitors for Sri Lanka
20th-century Sri Lankan people
21st-century Sri Lankan people